The Skyranger 35 is a short range air defence turret system developed by Rheinmetall Air Defence AG (formerly Oerlikon).

Design 
A mobile version of the Skyshield air defense system, it is based on a turret equipped with a 35 mm revolver cannon, based on the 35/1000 revolver gun. It can be elevated up to 85° with 360° rotation. The unmanned turret weighs 4.25 tonnes loaded and is controlled by two operators inside the vehicle. The gun is optimized to fire AHEAD (Advanced Hit Efficiency And Destruction) ammunition, an airburst round that releases a cloud of sub-projectiles just ahead of a target, enabling it to engage conventional as well as low, slow and small (LSS) air threats including UAVs and perform C-RAM duties.

The cannon can fire single-shots, rapid single shots at 200 rounds per minute or at a maximum rate of 1,000 rounds per minute. It has an effective range of 4,000 m. Skyranger 35 vehicles have an integrated sensor suite, consisting of an X-band or Ku-band tracking radar with a range out to 30 km and an EO/IR camera with a laser rangefinder and automatic target tracking. The turret carries 252 rounds. It can be mounted on various wheeled and tracked vehicles. Prototypes were integrated on the Piranha IIIH, Piranha IV and Boxer 8×8 armored personnel carriers.

In 2021, the Skyranger 30 was unveiled, which is a lighter version equipped with a 30 mm cannon and short-range surface-to-air missiles.

See also
Skyranger 30
Oerlikon GDF
Skyshield
Nächstbereichschutzsystem MANTIS
Flakpanzer Gepard
Type 87 self-propelled anti-aircraft gun
Marksman anti-aircraft system
PGZ-09
PZA Loara
KORKUT
Luftvärnskanonvagn (lvkv) 9040

References

External links
OERLIKON SKYRANGER® MOBILE AIR DEFENCE SYSTEM. Rheinmetall.

Weapon turrets